John F. Kennedy High School was a high school located in Taylor, Michigan, in the United States, in Metro Detroit.

The school, which had two stories, served portions of Taylor and Brownstown Township. It had a capacity smaller than that of Truman High School.

Notable alumni 
Joseph Calleja better known as Joe C., was an American rapper of Maltese descent. He became popular as part of Kid Rock's band.
Steve Avery is a former left-handed pitcher in Major League Baseball who was a young star with the Atlanta Braves in the early 1990s.

History
Kennedy High opened for classes on February 8, 1965. The 1965-66 enrollment was 1,359 10th and 11th grade students. In 1966, the school graduated 399 students in its first graduating class. On April 10, 2017, the Taylor School District Board voted 4–3 to close Kennedy High School due to declining enrollment and cost savings.

The school closed permanently after the 2018 school year, with its students and staff merged with Harry S. Truman High School to form a new school, called Taylor High School. The district decided to discontinue use of Kennedy's building partly because of the facility's smaller capacity, partly it was not compliant with the Americans with Disabilities Act (ADA) and that it had no elevator which could be used for disabled students, and partly because the boiler system and pool heater were not working.

References

External links
Taylor School District Home Page

Defunct schools in Michigan
Schools in Wayne County, Michigan
1965 establishments in Michigan
Educational institutions established in 1965
2018 disestablishments in Michigan
Educational institutions disestablished in 2018
Taylor, Michigan